Cary is a given name. Notable people with the name include:

 Cary Angeline (born 1997), American football player
 Cary Brothers (born 1974), American singer-songwriter
 Cary Elwes (born 1962), English actor and writer
 Cary Joji Fukunaga (born 1977), American film director
 Cary Grant (1904–1986), English-American actor
 Cary Guffey (born 1972), American former child actor
 Cary Huang (born 1997), animator, video producer, and educator
 Cary Kaplan, sports marketer
 Cary Kwok (born 1975), Hong Kong-born British artist 
 Cary Middlecoff (1921–1998), American professional golfer
 Cary Millholland Parker (1902–2001), landscape architect
 Cary-Hiroyuki Tagawa (born 1950), Japanese-born American actor, film producer, and martial artist
 Cary Wolfe (born 1959), academic and philosopher

See also

Cari (name)
Carry (name)

English masculine given names
English feminine given names